A generation gap or generational gap is a difference of opinions between one generation and another regarding beliefs, politics, or values. In today's usage, generation gap often refers to a perceived gap between younger people and their parents or grandparents.

History
Early sociologists such as Karl Mannheim noted differences across generations in how the youth transits into adulthood, and studied the ways in which generations separate themselves from one another, in the home and in social situations and areas (such as churches, clubs, senior centers, and youth centers).

The sociological theory of a generation gap first came to light in the 1960s, when the younger generation (later known as baby boomers) seemed to go against everything their parents had previously believed in terms of music, values, governmental and political views as well as cultural tastes. Sociologists now refer to the "generation gap" as "institutional age segregation". Usually, when any of these age groups are engaged in its primary activity, the individual members are physically isolated from people of other generations, with little interaction across age barriers except at the nuclear family level.

Distinguishing generation gaps
There are several ways to make distinctions between generations. For example, names are given to major groups (Silent Generation, Baby boomers, Generation X, Millennials, Generation Z, and Generation Alpha) and each generation sets its own trends and has its own cultural impact.

Language use
It can be distinguished by the differences in their language use. The generation gap has created a parallel gap in language that can be difficult to communicate across. This issue is one visible throughout society, creating complications within a day to day communication at home, in the workplace, and within schools. As new generations seek to define themselves as something apart from the old, they adopt new lingo and slang, allowing a generation to create a sense of division from the previous one. This is a visible gap between generations we see every day. "Man's most important symbol is his language and through this language, he defines his reality."

Slang
Slang is an ever-changing set of colloquial words and phrases that speakers use to establish or reinforce social identity or cohesiveness within a group or with a trend in society at large. As each successive generation of society struggles to establish its own unique identity among its predecessors it can be determined that generational gaps provide a large influence over the continual change and adaptation of slang. As slang is often regarded as an ephemeral dialect, a constant supply of new words is required to meet the demands of the rapid change in characteristics. And while most slang terms maintain a fairly brief duration of popularity, slang provides a quick and readily available vernacular screen to establish and maintain generational gaps in a societal context.

Technological influences
Every generation develops new slang, but with the development of technology, understanding gaps have widened between the older and younger generations. "The term 'communication skills,' for example, might mean formal writing and speaking abilities to an older worker. But it might mean e-mail and instant-messenger savvy to a twenty-something." People often have private conversations in secret in a crowded room in today's age due to the advances of mobile phones and text messaging. Among "texters" a form of slang or texting lingo has developed, often keeping those not as tech-savvy out of the loop. "Children increasingly rely on personal technological devices like cell phones to define themselves and create social circles apart from their families, changing the way they communicate with their parents. Cell phones, instant messaging, e-mail and the like have encouraged younger users to create their own inventive, quirky and very private written language. That has given them the opportunity to essentially hide in plain sight. They are more connected than ever, but also far more independent. Text messaging, in particular, has perhaps become this generation's version of Pig Latin."

While in the case of language skills such as shorthand, a system of stenography popular during the twentieth century, technological innovations occurring between generations have made these skills obsolete. Older generations used shorthand to be able to take notes and write faster using abbreviated symbols, rather than having to write each word. However, with new technology and the keyboard, newer generations no longer need these older communication skills, like Gregg shorthand. Although over 20 years ago, language skills such as shorthand classes were taught in many high schools, now students have rarely seen or even heard of forms like shorthand.

The transitions from each level of lifespan development have remained the same throughout history. They have all shared the same basic milestones in their travel from childhood, through midlife and into retirement.  However, while the pathways remain the same—i.e. attending school, marriage, raising families, retiring—the actual journey varies not only with each individual, but with each new generation.

In 2011, the National Sleep Foundation conducted a poll that focused on sleep and the use of technology; 95% of those polled admitted to using some form of technology within the last hour before going to bed at night. The study compared the difference in sleep patterns in those who watched TV or listened to music prior to bedtime compared to those who used cell phones, video games and the Internet. The study looked at Baby Boomers  (born 1946–1964), Generation Xers (born 1965–1980), Generation Yers (born 1981–1996), and Generation Zers (born 1997–2012). The research, as expected, showed generational gaps between the different forms of technology used. The largest gap was shown between texting and talking on the phone; 56% of Gen Zers and 42% of Gen Y’ers admitted to sending, receiving, reading text messages every night within one hour prior to bedtime, compared to only 15% of Gen Xers, and 5% of Baby Boomers. Baby Boomers were more likely to watch TV within the last hour prior to bedtime, 67%, compared to Millennials, who came in at 49%. When asked about computer/internet use within the last hour prior to bedtime, 70% of those polled admitted to using a computer "a few times a week", and from those, 55% of the Gen Z’ers said they "surf the web" every night before bed.

Language brokering

Another phenomenon within a language that works to define a generation gap occurs within families in which different generations speak different primary languages. In order to find a means to communicate within the household environment, many have taken up the practice of language brokering, which refers to the "interpretation and translation performed in everyday situations by bilinguals who have had no special training". In immigrant families where the first generation speaks primarily in their native tongue, the second generation primarily in the language of the country in which they now live while still retaining fluency in their parent's dominant language, and the third generation primarily in the language of the country they were born in while retaining little to no conversational language in their grandparent's native tongue, the second generation family members serve as interpreters not only to outside persons, but within the household, further propelling generational differences and divisions by means of linguistic communication.

In some immigrant families and communities, language brokering is also used to integrate children into family endeavors and into civil society. Child integration has become very important to form linkages between new immigrant communities and the predominant culture and new forms of bureaucratic systems. It also serves towards child development by learning and pitching in.

Workplace attitudes
USA Today reported that younger generations are "entering the workplace in the face of demographic change and an increasingly multi-generational workplace". Multiple engagement studies show that the interests shared across the generation gap by members of this increasingly multi-generational workplace can differ substantially.

A popular belief held by older generations is that the characteristics of Millennials can potentially complicate professional interactions. Some consider Millennials to be narcissistic and self-centered. When millennials first enter a new organization, they are often greeted with wary coworkers. Studies have found that millennials are usually exceptionally confident in their abilities and seek key roles in significant projects early on in their careers.

Most of these inflated expectations are direct results of the generation's upbringing. During the Great Recession, millennials watched first-hand as their parents worked long hours, only to fall victim to downsizing and layoffs. Many families could not withstand these challenges, leading to high divorce rates and broken families. In fact, 59% of Millennials say the Great Recession negatively impacted their career plans, while only 35% of mature workers feel the same way. For these reasons, millennials are more likely to negotiate the terms of their work. Though some boomers view this as lazy behavior, others have actually been able to learn from millennials, reflecting on whether the sacrifices that they had made in their lives provided them with the happiness that they had hoped for.

Growing up, millennials looked to parents, teachers, and coaches as a source of praise and support. They were a part of an educational system with inflated grades and standardized tests, in which they were skilled at performing well. Millennials developed a strong need for frequent, positive feedback from supervisors. Today, managers find themselves assessing their subordinates’ productivity quite frequently, despite the fact that they often find it burdensome. Additionally, millennials’ salaries and employee benefits give this generation an idea of how well they are performing. Millennials crave success, and good-paying jobs have been proven to make them feel more successful.

Because group projects and presentations were commonplace during the schooling of millennials, this generation enjoys collaborating and even developing close friendships with colleagues. While working as part of a team enhances innovation, enhances productivity, and lowers personnel costs. Supervisors find that millennials avoid risk and independent responsibility by relying on team members when making decisions, which prevents them from showcasing their own abilities.

Perhaps the most commonly cited difference between older and younger generations is technological proficiency. Studies have shown that their reliance on technology has made millennials less comfortable with face-to-face interaction and deciphering verbal cues. However, technological proficiency also has its benefits; millennials are far more effective in multitasking, responding to visual stimulation, and filtering information than older generations.

However, according to the engagement studies, mature workers and the new generations of workers share similar thoughts on a number of topics across the generation gap. Their opinions overlap on flexible working hours/arrangements, promotions/bonuses, the importance of computer proficiency, and leadership. Additionally, the majority of Millennials and mature workers enjoy going to work every day and feel inspired to do their best.

Generational consciousness
Generational consciousness is another way of distinguishing among generations that was worked on by social scientist Karl Mannheim. Generational consciousness is when a group of people become mindful of their place in a distinct group identifiable by their shared interests and values. Social, economic, or political changes can bring awareness to these shared interests and values for similarly-aged people who experience these events together and thereby form a generational consciousness. These types of experiences can impact individuals' development at a young age and enable them to begin making their own interpretations of the world based on personal encounters that set them apart from other generations.

Intergenerational living
"Both social isolation and loneliness in older men and women are associated with increased mortality, according to a 2012 Report by the National Academy of Sciences of the United States of America". Intergenerational living is one method being used worldwide as a means of combating such feelings. A nursing home in Deventer, The Netherlands, developed a program wherein students from a local university are provided small, rent-free apartments within the nursing home facility. In exchange, the students volunteer a minimum of 30 hours per month to spend time with the seniors. The students will watch sports with the seniors, celebrate birthdays, and simply keep them company during illnesses and times of distress.  Programs similar to the Netherlands’ program were developed as far back as the mid-1990s in Barcelona, Spain. In Spain's program, students were placed in seniors’ homes, with a similar goal of free or cheap housing in exchange for companionship for the elderly. That program quickly spread to 27 other cities throughout Spain, and similar programs can be found in Lyon, France, and Cleveland, Ohio.

Demographics
In order for sociologists to understand the transition into adulthood of children in different generation gaps, they compare the current generation to both older and earlier generations at the same time. Not only does each generation experience their own ways of mental and physical maturation, but they also create new aspects of attending school, forming new households, starting families and even creating new demographics. The difference in demographics regarding values, attitudes and behaviors between the two generations are used to create a profile for the emerging generation of young adults.

Following the thriving economic success that was a product of the Second World War, America's population skyrocketed between the years 1940-1959, to which the new American generation was called the Baby Boomers. Today, as of 2017, many of these Baby Boomers have celebrated their 60th birthdays and in the next few years America's senior citizen population will boost exponentially due to the population of people who were born during the years 1940 and 1959. The generation gap, however, between the Baby Boomers and earlier generations is growing due to the Boomers population post-war.

There is a large demographic difference between the Baby Boomer generation and earlier generations, where earlier generations are less racially and ethnically diverse than the Baby Boomers’ population.  Where this drastic racial demographic difference occurs also holds to a continually growing cultural gap as well; baby boomers have had generally higher education, with a higher percentage of women in the labor force and more often occupying professional and managerial positions. These drastic culture and generation gaps create issues of community preferences as well as spending.

See also

 Achievement gap
 Ageism
 Digital divide
 Income gap
 Inter-generational contract
 Intergenerational equity
 List of generations
 Marriage gap
 Moral panic
 Student activism
 Student voice
 Transgenerational design
 Youth activism
 Youth voice
 Slang
 Technology

References

Further reading
 Bennis, W. and Thomas, R. (2002) Geeks and Geezers:  how era, values and defining moments shape leaders, Harvard Business School Publishing
 Employee Evolution: the Voice of Millennials at Work

Ageism
Ageing
Gap
Subcultures
Youth
1960s neologisms